Louco Amor may refer to:
 Louco Amor (Portuguese TV series), a 2012-2013 telenovela
 Louco Amor (Brazilian TV series), a 1983 telenovela